Volodymyr Kravchenko (born 22 December 1969) is a Ukrainian triple jumper, best known for placing tenth at the 1996 Summer Olympics. His personal best was 16.80 metres, achieved in June 2000 in Kyiv.

Achievements

External links

1969 births
Living people
Ukrainian male triple jumpers
Athletes (track and field) at the 1996 Summer Olympics
Olympic athletes of Ukraine